Manginehi (also Romanized as Mangīneh’ī; also known as Mangīngī, Kūchūleh Mangīneh’ī, Mangi Navi, and Manjī Navī) is a village in Arabkhaneh Rural District, Shusef District, Nehbandan County, South Khorasan Province, Iran. At the 2006 census, its population was 66, in 21 families.

References 

Populated places in Nehbandan County